Glenwood Cemetery Mortuary Chapel is a historic chapel located in Glenwood Cemetery in Northeast, Washington, D.C.

It was built in 1892 in a Richardsonian Romanesque style.  It was designed by Glenn Brown.  The building was added to the National Register of Historic Places in 1989.

References

Chapels in Washington, D.C.
Properties of religious function on the National Register of Historic Places in Washington, D.C.
Churches completed in 1892
19th-century churches in the United States
Richardsonian Romanesque architecture in Washington, D.C.
Romanesque Revival church buildings in Washington, D.C.